Havelock is a city in Pocahontas County, Iowa, United States. The population was 130 at the time of the 2020 census.

History
Havelock was platted in 1881. It is named for Henry Havelock.

Geography
Havelock is located at  (42.833367, -94.701762).

Demographics

2010 census
At the 2010 census there were 138 people in 65 households, including 35 families, in the city. The racial makup of the city was 92.8% White, 1.4% Native American, 0.7% Asian, 0.7% Pacific Islander, and 4.3% from two or more races. Hispanic or Latino of any race were 6.5%.

Of the 65 households 21.5% had children under the age of 18 living with them, 40.0% were married couples living together, 7.7% had a female householder with no husband present, 6.2% had a male householder with no wife present, and 46.2% were non-families. 38.5% of households were one person and 15.4% were one person aged 65 or older. The average household size was 2.12 and the average family size was 2.74.

The median age was 43.3 years. 18.8% of residents were under the age of 18; 12.4% were between the ages of 18 and 24; 21.7% were from 25 to 44; 32.6% were from 45 to 64; and 14.5% were 65 or older. The gender makeup of the city was 49.3% male and 50.7% female.

2000 census
At the 2000 census there were 177 people in 82 households, including 44 families, in the city. The racial makup of the city was 97.74% White, and 2.26% from two or more races.
Of the 82 households 24.4% had children under the age of 18 living with them, 45.1% were married couples living together, 6.1% had a female householder with no husband present, and 46.3% were non-families. 42.7% of households were one person and 25.6% were one person aged 65 or older. The average household size was 2.16 and the average family size was 3.05.

The age distribution was 24.9% under the age of 18, 7.3% from 18 to 24, 24.3% from 25 to 44, 19.2% from 45 to 64, and 24.3% 65 or older. The median age was 42 years. For every 100 females, there were 90.3 males. For every 100 females age 18 and over, there were 92.8 males.

The median household income was $28,462 and the median family income  was $32,917. Males had a median income of $25,469 versus $24,375 for females. The per capita income for the city was $11,548. About 6.4% of families and 12.8% of the population were below the poverty line, including 7.5% of those under the age of eighteen and 24.4% of those sixty five or over.

Education
Pocahontas Area Community School District operates public schools. It was in the Havelock-Plover Community School District until July 1, 1989, when it consolidated into the Pocahontas School District, resulting in the Pocahontas Area School District.

References

External links
 City of Havelock, Iowa

Cities in Iowa
Cities in Pocahontas County, Iowa